Thomas Allnutt Brassey, 2nd Earl Brassey TD, DL, JP, MInstNA, AMICE (7 March 1863 – 12 November 1919), styled Viscount Hythe between 1911 and 1918, was a British peer, who was for many years editor or joint editor of Brassey's Naval Annual.

Brassey was the only son of Thomas Brassey, 1st Earl Brassey, by his first wife Anna, daughter of John Allnutt. He was educated at Eton and Balliol College, Oxford.

Brassey was an honorary Lieutenant in the London Brigade of Royal Naval Artillery Volunteers from 1888 to 1892. He acted as Assistant Private Secretary to Earl Spencer during the time the latter was First Lord of the Admiralty (1892–95), and in 1894 was Assistant Secretary of the Royal Commission on Opium that his father chaired.

Brassey was appointed a captain in the Queen's Own West Kent Yeomanry on 19 January 1898. After the outbreak of the Second Boer War in late 1899, Brassey volunteered for active service and was commissioned Captain of 69 (Sussex) Company of the Imperial Yeomanry on 28 March 1900. While in South Africa he served as acting Civil Commissioner for the British government at Pretoria in 1901, following its surrender by the Boers xthe previous year.

He later became Lieutenant-Colonel in command of the West Kent Yeomanry in 1910, retiring in May 1914. He was awarded the TD in 1909.  After the outbreak of the First World War he raised a second battalion to this regiment for home service, which he commanded until 1916, remaining on the Territorial Force Reserve.  He was also attached to the Royal Engineers Transport Staff and his service entitled him to two campaign medals, but the location of the qualifying service is not given.

He was editor of The Naval Annual from 1892 to 1899 and then either alone or jointly with John Leyland editor from 1902 to 1914, and finally in 1919.

He stood unsuccessfully for election to Parliament as Liberal candidate for Epsom in 1892, and for Christchurch in 1895 and 1900.  In the latter year's general election, he fought against Kenneth Robert Balfour, and after a close and disputed result, the two men gave their names to adjoining roads in the constituency.  He made a further unsuccessful attempt to stand for election at Devonport in 1902.  He was Mayor of Bexhill-on-Sea in 1909 and served as a Deputy Lieutenant and Justice of the Peace for Sussex. He was active in promoting a renewed Imperial Federation League.

Brassey was managing director of lead mining and smelting companies in mainland Italy and Sardinia, such as the mine in Ingurtosu, a hamlet belonging to Arbus, Sardinia.

He was Knight of Grace of the Order of St John of Jerusalem and Commander of the Order of the Crown of Italy.

Lord Brassey married Lady Idina Mary Nevill, daughter of William Nevill, 1st Marquess of Abergavenny, on 28 February 1889. They had no children. He succeeded to his father's title in 1918, enabling him to sit in the House of Lords. He died childless in November the following year, aged 56 after being hit by a taxi, when the titles became extinct. He was buried in Catsfield, Sussex. The Countess Brassey died in February 1951, aged 85.

Footnotes

References
 Ranft, Bryan (ed.), Ironclad to Trident,  100 Years of Defence Commentary, BRASSEYS's 1886–1986, Brassey's Defence Publishing (part of the Pergamon Group), 1986. .

External links

1863 births
1919 deaths
Earls in the Peerage of the United Kingdom
Alumni of Balliol College, Oxford
People educated at Eton College
Road incident deaths in England
British Army personnel of World War I
Knights of Grace of the Order of St John
Deputy Lieutenants of Sussex
Thomas Brassey, 2nd Earl Brassey
Imperial Yeomanry officers
Queen's Own West Kent Yeomanry officers
British Army personnel of the Second Boer War
Liberal Party (UK) hereditary peers
Liberal Party (UK) parliamentary candidates